The following is a list of 2019 box office number-one films in France.

References

2019
France
2019 in French cinema